3 May Constitution Day (also 3rd May National Holiday) is a Polish national and public holiday that takes place on 3 May. The holiday celebrates the declaration of the Constitution of 3 May 1791. Festivities date back to the Duchy of Warsaw early in the 19th century, but it became an official holiday only in 1919 in the Second Polish Republic. Delisted during the times of the Polish People's Republic, it was reestablished after the fall of communism in modern Poland.

Background

The Constitution of 3 May 1791 is considered one of the most important achievements in the history of Poland, despite being in effect for only a year, until the Russo-Polish War of 1792. Historian Norman Davies calls it "the first constitution of its type in Europe"; other scholars also refer to it as the world's second oldest constitution.

The 3 May Constitution was designed to redress long-standing political defects of the Polish–Lithuanian Commonwealth. The Constitution sought to supplant the existing anarchy fostered by some of the country's magnates with a more democratic constitutional monarchy.
The adoption of the 3 May Constitution provoked the active hostility of the Commonwealth's neighbours, leading to the Second Partition of Poland in 1792, the Kościuszko Uprising of 1794 and the final, Third Partition of Poland, in 1795. In the words of two of its co-authors, Ignacy Potocki and Hugo Kołłątaj, it was "the last will and testament of the expiring Fatherland."

The memory of the 3 May Constitution—recognised by political scientists as a very progressive document for its time—for generations helped keep alive Polish aspirations for an independent and just society, and continued to inform the efforts of its authors' descendants. In Poland it is viewed as a national symbol, and the culmination of all that was good and enlightened in Polish history and culture.

The 3 May anniversary of its adoption has been observed as Poland's most important civil holiday since Poland regained independence in 1918. Its importance for the Polish people has been compared to that of 4 July to the Americans.

Celebrations

3 May was first declared a holiday on 5 May 1791, and celebrated a year later, on 3 May 1792. Banned during the partitions of Poland it was celebrated in the Duchy of Warsaw in 1807, and unofficially in Congress Poland by various pro-independence activists, more openly during the times of insurrections, such as the November Uprising. It was again made an official Polish holiday in April 1919 under the Second Polish Republic—the first holiday officially introduced in the Second Polish Republic. The 3 May holiday was banned once more during World War II by the Nazi and Soviet occupiers. It was celebrated in the Polish cities in May 1945, although in a mostly spontaneous manner. The celebrations were officially canceled shortly before 3 May 1946, and the anti-communist demonstrations took place later that day. This, and the competition the date created with the communist-endorsed 1 May Labor Day celebrations, meant that the 3 May Constitution Day lost support with the authorities of the Polish People's Republic who forbade celebrating it. In 1947 it was officially rebranded Democratic Party Day and removed from the list of national holidays in 1951 .  Until 1989, 3 May was a common day for anti-government and anti-communist protests. 3 May was restored as an official Polish holiday in April 1990, after the fall of communism. In 2007, 3 May was also declared a Lithuanian national holiday; the first joint celebration by the Polish Sejm and the Lithuanian Seimas took place on 3 May 2007.

In modern Poland, this day, free from work, sees many parades, exhibitions, concerts and public figure speeches. Most important Polish politicians participate in those festivities; for example in 2011 President of Poland, Bronisław Komorowski, Prime Minister of Poland, Donald Tusk, and Marshal of the Sejm, Grzegorz Schetyna, Marshal of the Senate, Bogdan Borusewicz, and Minister of National Defence, Bogdan Klich, took part in the festivities in Warsaw. The official festivities in Warsaw or in other Polish cities in the presence of the President and important dignitaries would include flag flying, cannon salvos, reading of the constitution preamble, and singing a patriotic song from the November Uprising, Witaj, majowa jutrzenko (Welcome, May Dawn) plus drill shows and the annual military parade. Other events of the 2011 celebrations in Warsaw included a celebratory mass (see: The Most Holy Virgin Mary, Queen of Poland) in St. John's Archcathedral, Warsaw, and presidential awards for achievements in the field of advancing Polish culture. It is also held in various other Polish cities as well.

The holiday has been a focal point of ethnic celebrations of Polish-American pride in the Chicago area, where it is known as Polish Constitution Day, since 1892. Poles in Chicago have continued this tradition to the present day, marking it with festivities and the annual Polish Constitution Day Parade; guests of national stature, most notably Bobby Kennedy, have attended over the years as a way to ingratiate themselves with Chicago Polonia. In Minnesota, first celebrations date to the 1870s. In San Francisco, the anniversary of the May 3rd Constitution has been observed annually for decades in the Music Concourse at Golden Gate Park. In Buffalo, NY there is a Polish Happy Hour Buffalo event held every 3 May at the Adam Mickiewicz Library. There is free admission, free Polish food, Polish music played, and a reading of the preamble of the Polish Constitution in English and in Polish.

Notes
 a  The claims of "first" and "second constitution" have been disputed. Indeed, both documents in question (US and Polish constitutions) were preceded by earlier ones, including those also labelled as constitutions, e.g., the Corsican Constitution of 1755.* See History of the constitution for more information.

References

See also 

The Most Holy Virgin Mary, Queen of Poland — feast celebrate on the same day in Poland.

External links

Public holidays in Lithuania
Public holidays in Poland
Constitution days
Recurring events established in 1919
1919 establishments in Poland
Spring (season) events in Lithuania
Spring (season) events in Poland